Jacquet River is a former municipality in Restigouche County, New Brunswick, Canada on the Jacquet River. It is now part of the municipality of Belledune, and has a population of about 1,200 people.

It has an elementary and middle school, which is also used by the surrounding communities. It has a grocery store, along with a few locally owned convenience stores. It has a municipal park, which is maintained by the village. A song from the 1970s by Canadian artist Ray Griff references Jacquet River.

History
Jacquet River has a very strong history with many families having deep roots there, including the Guitard, Gauthier, Devereaux, Joncas, Cormier, Furlotte, Meade, Lapointe, Carriers, Hickey, Mallaley, Kelly, Dempsey, McNair, Driscoll, Culligan Doyle, and Legacy.

In 1994, the Village of Jacquet River, along with a few unincorporated communities, amalgamated with the Village of Belledune to form a larger village known as Belledune: "The Super Village".

Jacquet River is an English community, even though many confuse it with its fairly French name. Most people agree that Jacquet River got its name for the famous French explorer, Jacques Cartier, who landed around this area.

Notable people

See also
List of neighbourhoods in New Brunswick

References

Former villages in New Brunswick
Neighbourhoods in New Brunswick
Populated places disestablished in 1994